Branigan 2 is the second studio album by American singer Laura Branigan, released in March 1983 by Atlantic Records. The album reached number 29 on the US Billboard 200 and was certified Gold by the Recording Industry Association of America (RIAA) on September 18, 1985, denoting shipments in excess of 500,000 copies in the United States. In a retrospective review for AllMusic, Bryan Buss wrote that Branigan's "full, expressive voice shows serious growth" on "a much more cohesive collection" than her debut album, Branigan, adding that "this album doesn't waste a single track".

Three singles were released from the album. The lead single, "Solitaire", is a cover version of a 1981 French-language song of the same name by French singer Martine Clémenceau, with English lyrics written by Diane Warren. The single was a commercial success, peaking at number seven on the US Billboard Hot 100.

The second single, "How Am I Supposed to Live Without You", was co-written by Michael Bolton. It reached number 12 on the Billboard Hot 100 and topped the Adult Contemporary chart for three weeks. AllMusic viewed Branigan's version as "far superior" to Bolton's own commercially successful cover from 1989, stating it is "simpler, prettier, and shows shades of emotion at which Bolton could only hint".

Branigan 2 also includes a cover of the Who's "Squeeze Box" (1975), as well as "Deep in the Dark", a newly written song to the music of Falco's "Der Kommissar" (1981). "Deep in the Dark" was released in the United Kingdom as the album's third and final single.

The song "Find Me" was used as the love theme of the 1983 Robert Hays film Touched.

Track listing

Notes
  signifies original lyrics
  signifies English lyrics
  signifies original music

Personnel
Credits adapted from the liner notes of Branigan 2.

Musicians

 Laura Branigan – all vocals
 Robbie Buchanan – arrangements, synthesizers, keyboards
 Carlos Vega – drums
 Doane Perry – drums
 Michael Landau – guitars
 Marty Walsh – additional guitar on "Deep in the Dark"
 Dennis Belfield – bass
 Michael Boddicker – synthesizers
 Lenny Castro – percussion
 Jon Joyce – background vocals
 Jim Haas – background vocals
 Joe Pizzulo – background vocals
 Eddie Hawkins – additional background vocals on "Deep in the Dark" and "Lucky"
 Joe Esposito – additional background vocals on "Deep in the Dark"
 Gene Morford – additional background vocals on "Squeeze Box"

Technical
 Jürgen Koppers – engineering, mixing
 John Kovorek – engineering assistance
 Jon Van Nest – engineering assistance
 David Shire – rhythm track production on "Find Me"
 Carol Connors – rhythm track production on "Find Me"
 Brian Gardner – mastering
 Robbie Buchanan – associate production
 Jack White – production

Artwork
 Barry Levine – photography 
 Bob Defrin – art direction

Charts

Certifications

Notes

References

1983 albums
Albums produced by Jack White (music producer)
Atlantic Records albums
Laura Branigan albums